Passports in Europe are issued by each state individually, e.g. the Netherlands or United Kingdom. In general, passports issued in Europe either grant the holder the right of freedom of movement within the European Economic Area (EU and EFTA passports), to those that don't (EU candidate countries and other non-EU European states). The majority of European states are members of the European Union, and therefore issue EU passports.

All passports issued in Europe are B7 size and (ISO/IEC 7810 ID-3, 88 mm × 125 mm). The overwhelming majority of European passports are biometric. These include all EU, EFTA, British, and EU candidate passports.

There are also several passports issued by partially-recognised and disputed states, such as Northern Cyprus and Kosovo.

Passports of the European Union 

The EU itself does not issue ordinary passports, but ordinary passports issued by the 27 member states follow a common format. This includes a burgundy cover (not compulsory: Croatia is the only exception) emblazoned with the title "European Union", followed by the member state's name in their official language(s) (occasionally translation into English and French), their coat of arms, the word "PASSPORT", together with the biometric passport symbol. Holders of EU passports are citizens of the European Union and entitled to exercise the rights of that citizenship, e.g. freedom of movement.

Some EU member states also issue non-EU passports to certain people who have a nationality which is not supplemented by European Union citizenship (e.g., Danish nationals residing in the Faroe Islands).

In addition, the European Commission issues European Union Laissez-Passers to the members and certain civil servants of its institutions.

Overview of EU passports

Passports of European Union candidate countries 

Since the establishment of the European Economic Community, previous enlargements have seen the founding Inner Six states of 1958 grow to the EU's current 27 member-states. Currently, there are eight recognised candidates for future membership of the EU: Turkey (applied in 1987), North Macedonia (applied in 2004), Montenegro (applied in 2008), Albania (applied in 2009), Serbia (applied in 2009), Bosnia and Herzegovina (applied in 2016), Ukraine (applied in 2022) and Moldova (applied in 2022). All except Bosnia and Herzegovina, Ukraine and Moldova have started accession negotiations.

Unlike EU and EFTA passports, nationals carrying passports of EU candidate countries do not have free movement rights and are required to possess appropriate visas.

Overview of passports issued by EU candidate countries

Passports of EFTA member-states 

Like the EU, EFTA itself does not issue ordinary passports. It also does not issue any guidelines for a common passport design and format. The EFTA member states participate in the European Single Market and are part of the Schengen Area. EFTA member-states include Iceland, Norway, Switzerland, and Liechtenstein.

In accordance with the EFTA convention, nationals of EFTA member-states enjoy freedom of movement in each other's territory. EFTA nationals also enjoy freedom of movement with the EU. EFTA nationals and EU citizens and are not only visa-exempt but are legally entitled to enter and reside in each other's countries. The right of freedom of movement is defined by the Citizens’ Rights Directive, which defines the right of free movement for citizens of the European Economic Area (EEA), which includes the three EFTA members Iceland, Norway and Liechtenstein and EU member-states. Switzerland, which is a member of EFTA but not of the EEA, is not bound by the Directive but rather has a separate bilateral agreement on free movement with the EU.

British Passports 

Following the end of the UK's EU withdrawal transition period on 31 December 2020, British passports no longer grant holders the right to free movement within the EEA. British passports are issued to all types of British nationals. These include British Nationals (Overseas), British Overseas Territories Citizens (BOTCs), and British citizens resident in the Crown Dependencies.

The UK also participates in the Five Nations Passport Group, along with Canada, Australia, New Zealand, and the US.

In Europe, British passports are issued to British citizens, BOTCs in Gibraltar, and British citizens resident in the Crown Dependencies (Jersey, Guernsey, and the Isle of Man).

Overview of British passports

Other European passports

Overview of other European passports

See also 
 Visa requirements for European Union citizens
 Citizenship of the European Union
 National identity cards in the European Economic Area
 Passports of the EFTA member states
 Passports of European Union candidate states
 Five Nations Passport Group
 Visa policy in the European Union
 Schengen Area
 European Union laissez-passer
 British Passport

Notes

References 

Passports
Transport in Europe